Mohammadullah Hamkar (born 25 September 2001) is an Afghan cricketer. He made his first-class debut for Kabul Province in the 2018–19 Mirwais Nika Provincial 3-Day tournament on 15 February 2019. He made his List A debut for Band-e-Amir Region in the 2019 Ghazi Amanullah Khan Regional One Day Tournament on 17 September 2019. He made his Twenty20 debut on 9 September 2020, for Mis Ainak Knights in the 2020 Shpageeza Cricket League.

References

External links
 

2001 births
Living people
Afghan cricketers
Mis Ainak Knights cricketers
Place of birth missing (living people)